{{Infobox musical artist| 
| name            = Electronic
| image           = Electronic band.png
| caption         = Bernard Sumner (left) and Johnny Marr (right) of Electronic
| background      = group_or_band
| origin          = Manchester and Salford, England
| genre           = 
| years_active    = 1988<ref>Melody Maker, 13 April 1991</ref>–2001
| label           = 
| associated_acts = 
| past_members =
| current_members    = 
Bernard Sumner
Johnny Marr
}}
Electronic were an English alternative dance supergroup formed by singer/guitarist Bernard Sumner (of New Order) and guitarist Johnny Marr (of The Smiths). They co-wrote the majority of their output between 1989 and 1998, collaborating with Neil Tennant and Chris Lowe, of Pet Shop Boys, on three tracks in their early years, and former Kraftwerk member Karl Bartos on nine songs in 1995.

History
The two first met in 1984 when the Smiths guitarist contributed to a Quando Quango track that Sumner was producing. Later in 1988, Sumner was frustrated because his New Order bandmates were not receptive to his desire to add synth programming to their music. He decided to produce a solo album but found that he did not enjoy working alone, so he called Marr for help.

Inspired by contemporary dance music like Italo house and acts such as Technotronic, their initial concept was to release white label records on Factory and remain an anonymous entity,Uncut, April 1999 in contrast to their considerable reputations with The Smiths and New Order. The track "Lucky Bag" and the name Electronic itself are two of the vestiges of this initial approach. In 1989, Pet Shop Boys singer Neil Tennant suggested a collaboration when he heard of the budding partnership through sleeve designer Mark Farrow.

The fruits of this union became "Getting Away with It", Electronic's debut single which was released in December 1989 and sold around a quarter of a million copies. The drums on this record were played by ABC's David Palmer and the string arrangement was written by Anne Dudley. It was a Top 40 hit in America the following spring and they toured in support for Depeche Mode in August 1990. After this success, Sumner and Marr took a more commercial direction, blending synthesizers, guitars and analogue technology while retaining the template of contemporary alternative rock.

 Albums 

Electronic
After a year of intensive recording (and 18 months after "Getting Away with It"), the debut album Electronic was released to critical acclaimNME, 25 May 1991 (8/10)Entertainment Weekly, 21 June 1991 (A) and domestic commercial success, featuring the Top 10 single "Get the Message" and another Top 40 single, "Feel Every Beat". The album sold over a million copies worldwide.

Along with its fusion of rock and pop, Electronic continued their interest in dance music by inviting DJs to remix their singles and album tracks; this was a trend that continued throughout their career. Prominent acts that worked on Electronic songs around this period include Danny Rampling, DNA, Dave Shaw and Quando Quango founder and Haçienda DJ Mike Pickering.

After the first album was released and promoted, Marr and Sumner recorded albums with The The and New Order respectively, regrouping with Neil Tennant in 1992 to record their fourth and highest-charting single "Disappointed".

Raise the Pressure
Electronic was resumed when these activities ended, and work began on the second album in late 1994. The core duo was joined by Karl Bartos, ex-percussionist and songwriter with Kraftwerk.Raise the Pressure was released in July 1996 on the Parlophone label in the UK and Warner Bros. Like its predecessor it fused dance music with a guitar-led approach, but some reviewers felt its production was too rich and distracted from the songs. The album spawned two guitar oriented singles, "Forbidden City" [UK #14] and "For You" [UK #16], with the dancier "Second Nature" issued in February 1997 and reaching UK #35.

Twisted Tenderness
Electronic did not promote Raise the Pressure with a tour, although they performed its singles live on television shows including Top of the Pops and TFI Friday. Instead, they chose to swiftly record their third album. This was to be a reaction to the length of time they spent producing Raise the Pressure, with an emphasis on writing and demoing songs quickly before recording them. Marr and Sumner were joined by Doves bassist Jimi Goodwin and Black Grape drummer Ged Lynch, and together they made the album Twisted Tenderness as a more conventional four-piece group. The album did not return the group to their early 1990s levels of popularity but was well received by critics.NME, 17 April 1999 (7/10)Uncut, May 1999 (4/5)

Current status
Neither Sumner nor Marr has gone on record with any formal dissolution of the band despite both having moved on to other projects. However, in 2003, Marr did agree that the band had reached "its natural conclusion" and that he was happy that it ended on a positive note. Sumner recorded with New Order again and, in 2009, formed a new band, Bad Lieutenant. Marr has since worked with many acts, including The Healers, Pet Shop Boys, The Cribs and Modest Mouse, as well as releasing multiple solo albums.

Marr and Sumner played with the Doves for the Manchester v Cancer charity concert in January 2006 and the compilation album Get the Message – The Best of'' was released that September to mild promotion and sales [UK #194].  In July 2013 Sumner joined Marr at Jodrell Bank to perform "Getting Away With It".  Marr was supporting for New Order and performing songs from his career.

Members 
 Bernard Sumner – vocals, guitar, keyboards (1988–2001)
 Johnny Marr – guitars, bass, vocals, keyboards (1988–2001)

Collaborators
 Neil Tennant – vocals, keyboards, guitar (1989–1994)
 Chris Lowe – keyboards (1989–1994)
 Karl Bartos – percussion, synthesizers, vocals (1995)
 Jimi Goodwin – bass, vocals, guitar, keyboards (1999)
 Ged Lynch – drums, percussion (1996–1999)
Kester Martinez - drums (1990+)

Discography

Studio albums

Compilation albums

Singles

Promotional singles

Music videos

Notes

References

External links
 feel every beat (unofficial website)
 worldinmotion.net (unofficial website)

Alternative dance musical groups
English rock music groups
Rock music supergroups
British supergroups
Electronic music supergroups
English electronic music duos
Male musical duos
Musical groups from Manchester
Musical groups established in 1988
Musical groups disestablished in 2001
Factory Records artists
Dance-rock musical groups
English alternative rock groups
English synth-pop groups
1988 establishments in England